SolidWorks (stylized as SOLIDWORKS) is a solid modeling computer-aided design (CAD) and computer-aided engineering (CAE) application published by Dassault Systèmes.

According to the publisher, over two million engineers and designers at more than 165,000 companies were using SolidWorks as of 2013. According to the company, fiscal year 2011–12 revenue for SolidWorks totaled $483 million.

History
SolidWorks Corporation was founded in December 1993 by Massachusetts Institute of Technology graduate Jon Hirschtick. Hirschtick used $1 million he had made while a member of the MIT Blackjack Team to set up the company. Initially based in Waltham, Massachusetts, United States, Hirschtick recruited a team of engineers with the goal of building 3D CAD software that was easy-to-use, affordable, and available on the Windows desktop. Operating later from Concord, Massachusetts, SolidWorks released its first product SolidWorks 95, in November 1995. In 1997 Dassault, best known for its CATIA CAD software, acquired SolidWorks for $310 million in stock. Jon Hirschtick stayed on board for the next 14 years in various roles. Under his leadership, SolidWorks grew to a $100 million revenue company.

SolidWorks currently markets several versions of the SolidWorks CAD software in addition to eDrawings, a collaboration tool, and DraftSight, a 2D CAD product.

SolidWorks was headed by John McEleney from 2001 to July 2007, Jeff Ray from 2007 to January 2011, Bertrand Sicot from 2011 to Jan 2015 and Gian Paolo Bassi from 2015 to Jan 2022. In February 2022, Manish Kumar was named as the new CEO of SOLIDWORKS while Gian Paolo Bassi was promoted to be the Executive VP of 3DEXPERIENCE WORKS at Dassault Systèmes.

Release history

Market
DS Solidworks Corp. has sold over 3.5 million licenses of SolidWorks worldwide. This includes a large proportion of educational licenses.

Its user base ranges from individuals to large corporations, and covers a very wide cross-section of manufacturing market segments. Commercial sales are made through an indirect channel, which includes dealers and partners throughout the world. In the United States, the first reseller of SolidWorks, in 1995, was Computer Aided Technology, LLC, headquartered in Chicago. Directly competitive products to SolidWorks include PTC Creo Elements/Pro, Solid Edge, and Autodesk Inventor. SolidWorks also partners with third-party developers to add functionality in niche market applications like finite element analysis, circuit layout, tolerance checking, etc. SolidWorks has also licensed its 3D modeling capabilities to other CAD software vendors, notably ANVIL.

Modeling technology

SolidWorks is a solid modeler, and utilizes a parametric feature-based approach which was initially developed by PTC (Creo/Pro-Engineer) to create models and assemblies. The software uses the Parasolid modelling kernel.

Parameters refer to constraints whose values determine the shape or geometry of the model or assembly. Parameters can be either numeric parameters, such as line lengths or circle diameters, or geometric parameters, such as tangent, parallel, concentric, horizontal or vertical, etc. Numeric parameters can be associated with each other through the use of relations, which allows them to capture design intent.

Design intent is how the creator of the part wants it to respond to changes and updates. For example, you would want the hole at the top of a beverage can to stay at the top surface, regardless of the height or size of the can. SolidWorks allows the user to specify that the hole is a feature on the top surface, and will then honor their design intent no matter what height they later assign to the can.

Features refer to the building blocks of the part. They are the shapes and operations that construct the part. Shape-based features typically begin with a 2D or 3D sketch of shapes such as bosses, holes, slots, etc. This shape is then extruded to add or cut to remove material from the part. Operation-based features are not sketch-based, and include features such as fillets, chamfers, shells, applying draft to the faces of a part, etc.

Building a model in SolidWorks usually starts with a 2D sketch (although 3D sketches are available for power users). The sketch consists of geometry such as points, lines, arcs, conics (except the hyperbola), and splines. Dimensions are added to the sketch to define the size and location of the geometry. Relations are used to define attributes such as tangency, parallelism, perpendicularity, and concentricity. The parametric nature of SolidWorks means that the dimensions and relations drive the geometry, not the other way around. The dimensions in the sketch can be controlled independently, or by relationships to other parameters inside or outside the sketch.

In an assembly, the analog to sketch relations are mates. Just as sketch relations define conditions such as tangency, parallelism, and concentricity with respect to sketch geometry, assembly mates define equivalent relations with respect to the individual parts or components, allowing the easy construction of assemblies. SolidWorks also includes additional advanced mating features such as gear and cam follower mates, which allow modeled gear assemblies to accurately reproduce the rotational movement of an actual gear train.

Finally, drawings can be created either from parts or assemblies. Views are automatically generated from the solid model, and notes, dimensions and tolerances can then be easily added to the drawing as needed. The drawing module includes most paper sizes and standards (ANSI, ISO, DIN, GOST, JIS, BSI and SAC).

File format 
SolidWorks files (previous to version 2015) use the Microsoft Structured Storage file format. This means that there are various files embedded within each SLDDRW (drawing files), SLDPRT (part files), SLDASM (assembly files) file, including preview bitmaps and metadata sub-files. Various third-party tools (see COM Structured Storage) can be used to extract these sub-files, although the sub-files in many cases use proprietary binary file formats.

SolidWorks allows saving 3D model information in *.step format, which lets the model be displayed and modified in other platforms from other vendors.

Associated products 
SolidWorks has developed also various complementary add-ins, including:
 PhotoWorks : 3D photorealistic rendering engine.
 3DVIA Composer : content creation software for documentation, technical illustration, catalogs, commercial brochures, training documents, maintenance manuals from CAD data with updates of CAD changes.
 3DEXPERIENCE Marketplace : an add-in allowing users to download 3D parts from an online catalog on make 3D printed parts on-demand

See also
 Comparison of computer-aided design software

References

External links 

3D graphics software
Windows-only software
Solid mechanics
Product design
Computer-aided design software for Windows
1995 software
Dassault Group
Proprietary software
1993 establishments in Massachusetts
Companies established in 1993